Strathclyde may refer to:

 Strathclyde, the former local government region of Scotland, 1973 to 1996, which served as a police force area and fire service area until 2013, and is still a transport authority area, covered by:
 Strathclyde Police
 Strathclyde Fire and Rescue Service
 Strathclyde Partnership for Transport (formerly Strathclyde Passenger Transport)
 The Kingdom of Strathclyde, the ancient Brythonic kingdom which included most of the area of the former local government region

Other things in Scotland with Strathclyde in their names include:
University of Strathclyde, in Glasgow
Strathclyde Business School
Strathclyde Park, in North Lanarkshire
Strathclyde F.C., defunct football team based in Glasgow

People bearing the name Strathclyde include:
 List of Kings of Strathclyde
 Those bearing the title Baron Strathclyde:
 Alexander Ure, 1st Baron Strathclyde
 Thomas Galbraith, 2nd Baron Strathclyde

Other uses:
 Strathclyde Concertos, ten concertos by Peter Maxwell Davies